The 2013 Korea National League Championship, known as Korea Hydro & Nuclear Power 2013 National League Championship, was the tenth competition of the Korea National League Championship.

Group stage

Group A

Group B

Knockout stage

Bracket

Semi-finals

Final

See also
2013 in South Korean football
2013 Korea National League

References

External links

Korea National League Championship seasons
K